Louis Rothschild may refer to:

 Louis Nathaniel de Rothschild (1882–1955), Austrian baron
 Louis F. Rothschild (1869–1957), American investment banker and founder of investment banking firm L.F. Rothschild
 Georges Mandel (1885–1944), French journalist, politician, and French Resistance leader, born Louis George Rothschild
 Louis S. Rothschild (1900–1984), American investment banker